Premachi Goshta (meaning: Story of Love) is a 2013 Marathi language film directed by Satish Rajwade. The film released on 1 February 2013. The film features Atul Kulkarni and Sagarika Ghatge in lead roles and Sulekha Talwalkar, Satish Rajwade and Rohini Hattangadi in supporting roles. The film marks the debut of actress Sagarika Ghatge in marathi.

A dialogue in the film hints that the story could be inspired from A Midsummer Night's Dream, a play by William Shakespeare.

The first look promo of the film was released on 18 December 2012 in an event organized at the Citi Light Cinema, Mahim.

Plot
The story of the film is of two strangers, Ram and Sonal, who meet at the marriage counselor's office, start talking with each other and get to know each other. Ram is in the office trying to maintain his marriage with Ragini, who is an aspiring actress. Ram believes that she would return to him. Whereas Sonal has lost all faith in marriage and is here to get divorced from Samit.
They both meet again in very strange situation. Sonal was trying to get a job and come to Ram's office without knowing that she'll be interviewed by Ram himself.
Eventually Sonal gets a job as ram's associate. Sonal develops feelings for Ram. but Ram, the man with values, still hopes that his wife will return. After reading Ram's story about Love, Sonal suggests Ram that he should tell his story to producers because anybody would fall in Love after reading his story. He does that and eventually he gets the offer from a producer because producer likes the story very much.
Just when Ram was about to propose Sonal, her husband came into picture and Ram starts staying away from Sonal.  At the same time, Ram's wife realizes her mistake of leaving Ram, comes back to his life, but Ram is now deeply in love with Sonal.  They both face very difficult phase as they realize they can't confess their love due to their mutual misunderstanding. Finally, Ram's wife realize that Ram is no longer into her and he loves Sonal instead, she tells Ram to go to Sonal and confess his feelings. At the same time, Sonal realizes that her husband is good for nothing and decides to come back to Ram.  After so much hustle, they both meet at the office again and confess their true feelings and here ends the tale of a simple yet beautiful love story between Ram and Sonal.

Cast
Atul Kulkarni, who is the two times winner of the National Film Award for Best Supporting Actor and has played various character roles, would be seen for the first time in a romantic role. Sagarika Ghatge who is known for her role of the hockey player Preeti Sabarwal in the 2007 Bollywood film Chak De! India makes her debut in Marathi cinema through this film. Also the film marks comeback of BAFTA Award winner Rohini Hattangadi in Marathi cinema after a long duration. The film is directed by Satish Rajwade whose previous Marathi film Mumbai-Pune-Mumbai was quite successful.

 Atul Kulkarni as Ram Subramanyam
 Sagarika Ghatge as Sonal
 Rohini Hattangadi as Ram's mother
 Sulekha Talwalkar as Ragini
 Meera Welankar
 Ajay Purkar as Samit
 Satish Rajwade as Swaraj

Soundtrack

The lyrics for the film were penned by Ashwini Shende and Vishwajeet Joshi with music and background score composed by the duo Avinash-Vishwajeet.

Promotion and reception
The film was promoted by the lead actors in a unique way, by organizing a kite festival on 14 January 2013, the day of Makar Sankranti. More than 1500 kites were flown, which had film's name on them. Although the film has a clichéd love-story plot, the film has been appreciated for putting forth "love beyond relationship".

References

External links
 

2013 films
2010s Marathi-language films
Films directed by Satish Rajwade